Bánffytelep is the Hungarian name for two villages in Romania:

 Fiad village, Telciu Commune, Bistriţa-Năsăud County
 Dealu Negru village, Călățele Commune, Cluj County